Long Island Jewish Forest Hills is a teaching hospital operating under the Northwell Health hospital network. It is located in Forest Hills, Queens, New York. The hospital is affiliated with the Donald and Barbara Zucker School of Medicine at Hofstra/Northwell, which sponsors a residency program in internal medicine. The hospital also serves as the host of a podiatry residency program.

History
The hospital first opened on August 13, 1953 as Forest Hills General Hospital. In May 1963, the Queens District Attorney opened an investigation into the finances of the institution after a former employee reported that the administration of the hospital was involved in a Blue Cross billing scheme. The scandal led to the hospital's closure in November 1963. In 1964, the hospital reopened as LaGuardia Hospital, now under the management of HIP. It was later acquired by the North Shore health system in 1996 and renamed North Shore University Hospital at Forest Hills. In 2006, the hospital was renamed Forest Hills Hospital.

In 2016, Northwell Health announced that that state of New York had approved a request to operate the hospital under its network. The hospital was subsequently renamed Long Island Jewish Forest Hills.

Services
The hospital currently manages 312 beds and offers general inpatient medical, surgical, intensive care, obstetrics and gynecological services. The Emergency Department at LIJ Forest Hills is both a certified heart station and New York State designated stroke center. In 2017, the hospital reported 16,500 inpatient discharges, over 2,000 baby deliveries, and over 50,000 Emergency Department visits.

LaGuardia Hospital
LaGuardia Hospital (named for Fiorello H. La Guardia) was an interim name under which the hospital operated from 1964 through 1996. During those years, it was managed by HIP.

See also

 List of hospitals in Queens

References

Hospitals in Queens, New York
1953 establishments in New York City
Hospital buildings completed in 1953
Forest Hills, Queens